Sir Ronald Francis Lodge (8 April 1889 – 3 March 1960) was a British judge in India.

A member of the Indian Civil Service, Lodge was a puisne judge of the Calcutta High Court from 1941 to 1948. After Indian independence, he became the first Chief Justice of the Assam High Court from 1948 to 1949. He was also acting Governor of Assam.

He was one of the judges who heard the appeal in the Bhawal case.

References 

Knights Bachelor
British India judges
Judges of the Calcutta High Court
Chief Justices of the Gauhati High Court
Indian Civil Service (British India) officers